In computing, Machine Check Architecture (MCA) is an Intel and AMD mechanism in which the CPU reports hardware errors to the operating system.
fa:معماری چک ماشین
Intel's P6 and Pentium 4 family processors, AMD's K7 and K8 family processors, as well as the Itanium architecture implement a machine check architecture that provides a mechanism for detecting and reporting hardware (machine) errors, such as: system bus errors, ECC errors, parity errors, cache errors, and translation lookaside buffer errors. It consists of a set of model-specific registers (MSRs) that are used to set up machine checking and additional banks of MSRs used for recording errors that are detected.

See also
 Machine-check exception (MCE)
 High availability (HA)
 Reliability, availability and serviceability (RAS)
 Windows Hardware Error Architecture (WHEA)

References

External links
 Microsoft's article on Itanium's MCA
 Linux x86 daemon for processing of machine checks

Computer architecture
x86 architecture